Teton Saltes (born May 4, 1998) is an American football offensive tackle for the Arlington Renegades of the XFL. He played college football at the University of New Mexico, where he was the 2020 recipient of the Wuerffel Trophy, given to the player who "best combines exemplary community service with athletic and academic achievement".

High school career 
Saltes focused more on playing basketball, and as a result, did not play football until his junior year of high school. Once he started playing, he received offers from schools such as San Diego State, Texas Tech, and Iowa State. Ultimately, he committed to playing college football at New Mexico in 2016.

College career  
After redshirting his true freshman season, Saltes switched from the defensive line to offensive line and worked his way to the starting right tackle job. He was named to the All-Mountain West team as an honorable mention in 2019 as a redshirt junior, and to the All-Mountain West third-team by Pro Football Focus.

In his redshirt senior season, Saltes was recognized for his community service work, being named the recipient of the Wuerffel Trophy, as well as the team captain of the Allstate AFCA Good Works Team.

Professional career 
After not being drafted in the 2021 NFL Draft, Saltes signed with the New York Jets as an undrafted free agent. He was waived/injured on August 9, 2021 and placed on injured reserve. He was released on October 25.

Saltes was selected with the fourth pick of the sixth round by the Michigan Panthers on February 22, 2022, during the 2022 USFL Draft. He was added to the inactive roster on May 5, 2022, with an illness. He was moved to the active roster on May 11.

The Arlington Renegades selected Saltes in the first round of the 2023 XFL Supplemental Draft on January 1, 2023. He was placed on the reserve list by the team on February 24, 2023.

Personal life 
Saltes lived on the Pine Ridge Indian Reservation in South Dakota before leaving the reservation with his mother when she got into medical school, eventually settling in New Mexico. He still returns to Pine Ridge every summer to mentor children on the reservation, as well as bring awareness to suicides among Native Americans in the United States.

References

External links 
 
 New Mexico Lobos profile

1998 births
Living people
People from the Pine Ridge Indian Reservation, South Dakota
People from Pine Ridge, South Dakota
Players of American football from South Dakota
Players of American football from Albuquerque, New Mexico
American football defensive linemen
American football offensive tackles
New Mexico Lobos football players
University of New Mexico alumni
New York Jets players
Michigan Panthers (2022) players
Arlington Renegades players